Ain't Living Long Like This is the debut studio album by American country music singer-songwriter Rodney Crowell, released in 1978 by Warner Bros. Records. It failed to enter the Top Country Albums chart. The songs, "Elvira", "Song for the Life" and "(Now and Then, There's) A Fool Such as I" were released as singles but they all failed to chart within the top 40. Despite this, Ain't Living Long Like This is considered one of Crowell's best and most influential albums. Brett Hartenbach of Allmusic says it "not only showcases his songwriting prowess, but also his ability to deliver a song, whether it's one of his own or the work of another writer". Most of the songs on this album were later covered by other artists including The Oak Ridge Boys and Alan Jackson. When the album was re-released in 2002 the font on the cover was enlarged to make it more legible.

Content 
Three of the tracks are cover songs:
 "Elvira" – Dallas Frazier, Elvira (1966)
 "(Now and Then, There's) A Fool Such as I" – Hank Snow(1952) [Covered by many other artists such as Elvis Presley, Bob Dylan, Eddy Arnold, Jim Reeves and Lou Rawls]
 "I Thought I Heard You Callin' My Name" – Norma Jean, Let's Go All the Way (1965)

Many Crowell-penned songs have since been covered by other artists. "Leaving Louisiana in the Broad Daylight" was covered by Emmylou Harris in 1978 and, a year later, by The Oak Ridge Boys from The Oak Ridge Boys Have Arrived. They released it as a single that reached Number One.

"Voila, An American Dream" was covered (as "An American Dream") by The Nitty Gritty Dirt Band and was the title track to their 1979 album. Released as a single, the record hit #13 on the U.S. pop charts and #3 in Canada.

"I Ain't Living Long Like This" was recorded in 1977 by Gary Stewart for his album, Your Place or Mine., then recorded in 1978 by Emmylou Harris for her album, Quarter Moon in a Ten Cent Town, and in 1979 by Waylon Jennings for his album, What Goes Around Comes Around, and Jerry Jeff Walker for his album, Too Old to Change. Brooks & Dunn recorded a version in 2003 as a tribute to Waylon. Andy Griggs recorded a version for his 1999 first album, You Won't Ever Be Lonely.

"Baby, Better Start Turnin' 'Em Down" was covered by Emmylou Harris on her 1983 album White Shoes and by Rosanne Cash on her 1979 album Right or Wrong. "Song for the Life" was first covered in 1980 by John Denver and in 1982 by Waylon Jennings. Alan Jackson released his version as a single from his album Who I Am in 1994 where it became a top ten hit.

Willie Nelson, Ricky Skaggs, Emmylou Harris and Nicolette Larson sang background vocals on several of the tracks.

Track listing 
All tracks composed by Rodney Crowell; except where indicated
Side 1
 "Elvira" (Dallas Frazier) – 4:26
 "(Now and Then There's) A Fool Such as I" (Bill Trader) – 3:14
 "Leaving Louisiana in the Broad Daylight" (Donivan Cowart, Rodney Crowell) – 3:26
 "Voilá, An American Dream" – 3:53
 "I Ain't Living Long Like This" – 5:04
Side 2
 "Baby, Better Start Turnin' 'Em Down" – 4:31
 "Song for the Life" – 4:43
 "I Thought I Heard You Callin' My Name" (Lee Emerson) – 3:13
 "California Earthquake (A Whole Lotta Shakin' Goin' On)" – 6:20

Personnel 
 Rodney Crowell – vocals, acoustic guitar

Additional musicians
 Brian Ahern – acoustic guitar, percussion
 Byron Berline – fiddle, violin
 Hal Blaine – drums
 James Burton – Dobro, electric guitar, acoustic guitar
 Ry Cooder – acoustic and slide guitar
 Donivan Cowart – background vocals
 Hank DeVito – steel guitar
 Dr. John – keyboards
 Amos Garrett – acoustic and electric guitar
 John Goldthwaite – electric guitar
 Emory Gordy Jr. – bass guitar
 Richard Greene – strings
 Glen Hardin – piano
 Emmylou Harris – acoustic guitar, electric guitar, background vocals
 Jerry Jumonville  – horns, saxophone
 Jim Keltner – drums
 Nicolette Larson – background vocals
 Albert Lee – electric guitar, mandolin, piano, acoustic guitar, background vocals
 Willie Nelson – background vocals
 Mickey Raphael – harmonica
 Tom Sauber – banjo
 Ricky Skaggs – fiddle, violin, background vocals
 John Ware – percussion, drums
 Larry Willoughby – background vocals

Sources 

 CMT
 Allmusic
 AOL Music

1978 debut albums
Rodney Crowell albums
Warner Records albums
Albums produced by Brian Ahern (producer)